Albert Charpin, born in Grasse, Alpes-Maritimes in 1842, died in Asnières-sur-Seine in 1924. He was a naturalist painter associated with the Barbizon school. He painted real objects in a natural setting.  A pupil of Charles-François Daubigny, Charpin was a painter of natural landscapes with, typically, a shepherdess and her guardian-dog taking care of animals, cows or sheep. Characteristic of his paintings are the natural poses and serenity of his actors, in a context of early morning light, with cloudy skies. He was a well-known member of the Barbizon School.  One of his paintings, "Le Retour à la Ferme", is at the Musée des Beaux-Arts at Chambéry in Savoie.  His paintings can also found in museums and private collections elsewhere in Europe and in the Americas.

1842 births
1924 deaths
People from Grasse
19th-century French painters
French male painters
20th-century French painters
20th-century French male artists
French Realist painters
19th-century French male artists